The Democrats (LD) is a political party in Benin. Founded and led by former President Thomas Boni Yayi, it is currently the only opposition party represented in the National Assembly following the 2023 Beninese parliamentary election. Ideologically, the party has been described as left-wing.

History 

The Democrats were founded by former President Thomas Boni Yayi in July 2019, and were registered to the Autonomous National Electoral Commission (ANEC) on 11 December 2020, although the party had no elected officials yet at the time. Ahead of the 2023 Beninese parliamentary election, the party announced its intent to contest the election and called for "an inclusive, free, transparent and peaceful ballot." The party also sought to involve the opposition at all levels of the electoral process.

In the parliamentary election, the Democrats obtained 24.16% of the vote and 28 deputies, marking the return of the opposition to the National Assembly after four years of absence. Eric Houndété, the president of the Democrats, dismissed the results, declaring that "the Democratic Party rejects these results, which do not reflect the will of the people to make us the first political force in the country" and making claims of vote buying and ballot stuffing by the two main pro-government parties.

Ideology 

The party is described as ideologically left-wing due to its positions on free education, the role of civil society, and free caesarean sections. During the 2021 Beninese presidential election, the Democrats' electoral program sought to invest massively in the Beninese economy in order to fight against poverty and unemployment among young people.

Electoral history

Presidential elections

Parliamentary elections

Footnotes

References 

2019 establishments in Benin
2020 establishments in Benin
Political parties established in 2019
Political parties in Benin